Walter Rudi Wand (7 September 1928 in Kleinkeula – 29 June 1985 in Karlsruhe) was a German judge and bureaucrat. He studied legal science in Jena and Berlin. He was a justice of the Federal Constitutional Court.

20th-century German judges
People from Unstrut-Hainich-Kreis
Justices of the Federal Constitutional Court
1928 births
1985 deaths
Grand Crosses with Star and Sash of the Order of Merit of the Federal Republic of Germany